The Vasse-Wonnerup Estuary is an estuary in the South West region of Western Australia close to the town of Busselton. The estuary is listed with DIWA. It is also the main part of the  Busselton Wetlands Important Bird Area.

Description
The estuary is wave dominated and has been severely modified from its natural state. The site of the Vasse and Wonnerup Floodgates that regulated the flow of water in the estuary from about 1907 inadvertently created the freshwater wetland, were listed on the Western Australian Register of Heritage Places in 2005. Paperbark woodland occurs behind the samphire belt, with eucalypt woodland on higher ground.

Catchment
The catchment of the estuary is 52% cleared and is used primarily for crops and pastures but also for plantations. The waters are susceptible to pollution from run-off as houses in Busselton have been built adjacent to the estuary. The Abba River, Ludlow River, Sabina River and Vasse River all discharge into the estuary.

The coastal plain area is composed of sandy and duplex soils that are easily water-logged. An extensive drainage network has been constructed to protect Busselton and Wonnerup from flooding and to create agricultural land.

Birds
It is estimated that over 20,000 waterbirds use the estuary as habitat with over 80 species of waterbird being found. Some of the species found in the area include black-winged stilt, banded stilt, Australasian shoveller, Australian shelduck and the red-necked avocet. The largest breeding colony of black swans in Western Australia (over 150 pairs) is in the estuary.

Fish kills
Fish kills have occurred in the estuary in 2009, 2011 and 2013. In the 2013 event an estimated 7,000 fish died over the course of two days, calling into question the health of the waterway. It is thought that low flows, poor water quality and high phosphorus levels were to blame. Rainfall washed nutrients downstream to the estuary then a warm spell sparked the growth of algae depleting the water of oxygen, killing the fish.

References

Estuaries of Western Australia
Ramsar sites in Australia
Swan Coastal Plain
Important Bird Areas of Western Australia
Busselton
DIWA-listed wetlands